The Olympus E-410 (or Olympus EVOLT E-410 in North America) is a 10 megapixel digital single-lens reflex (DSLR) camera intended be the smallest and lightest DSLR on the market. Announced in March 2007 to succeed the E-400 (which was only marketed in Europe), it adds a live preview function and a new "Olympus TruePic III" processing chip that is claimed to provide better performance.

The E-410 body and lens mount conform to the Four Thirds System standard, providing compatibility with other lenses for that system. (Four Thirds System lenses are smaller and lighter than lenses with similar specifications from other DSLR systems.)

Like the E-400, the E-410 is notable for its small size, omitting the hand grip and exploiting the smaller sensor of the Four Thirds System. It weighs only 375g and approaches manual focus film SLR sizes, reminiscent of the Olympus OM system. It is accompanied by two new small zoom lenses, a 14–42 mm (28–84 mm 135 film format equivalent) f/3.5–5.6 standard zoom weighing 190g and a 40–150 mm (80–300 mm equivalent) f/4.0–5.6 long zoom weighing 220g.

The E-410 uses Olympus' patented Supersonic Wave Filter dust reduction system to shake dust from the sensor during startup and when requested by the user; this largely eliminates the problem of dust accumulation on the surface of the image sensor.

The camera was succeeded by the E-420. This newer camera's most notable enhancement over the E-410 is a contrast autofocusing system, for faster shooting in Live View mode.

External links

Press release
Specifications and ratings at dpreview.com
Review at Photography Blog

Four Thirds System
Live-preview digital cameras
E-410
Cameras introduced in 2007